Vale Park is a suburb of Adelaide in the Town of Walkerville, Australia. It is located northeast of the Adelaide city centre between North East Road and the River Torrens, astride Ascot Avenue, part of the A17 highway which is the eastern ring route bypass of Adelaide.

Vale Park was originally a private subdivision named after Vale House, the home of Philip Levi, a pastoral pioneer.

History
The eastern section of Vale Park was originally known as Hamilton, after Robert Hamilton, who owned the first farmhouse built there, Hamilton House. This was demolished in 2017. Hamilton was home to a few farmers; however, the original subdivisions weren't very popular because the land was thought to be too far from the city. Today the land value in Vale Park is very high. In the 1930s the area started to be referred to as Willow Bend.

Market gardens and horse trotting tracks were the main uses of the land until the early 1960s.

The suburb of Vale Park was proclaimed in 1961 and development started. These 1960s houses remained relatively untouched until recently, when they have started to be demolished in the process of urban infill, which is becoming increasingly common in inner-city Adelaide suburbs over 50 years old.

On 3 August 1964 Vale Park Primary school opened on Ascot Avenue. , 506 students were enrolled at the school.

Politics
The suburb has lain with the following state-level electoral districts:
1956–1970: Enfield 
1970–1993: Gilles
1993–2002: Torrens
2002–2014: Norwood 
2014–2018: Dunstan
2018–present: Torrens

See also
List of Adelaide suburbs

References

Suburbs of Adelaide